Seoul Samsung Thunders is a professional basketball team, competing in the Korean Basketball League. Ever since the club was founded in 1978, they have been associated with Samsung Electronics. Initially based in Suwon, they relocated to Seoul in 2001, and had played their home games at Jamsil Arena ever since.

Team names
 1978–1982: Samsung Men's Basketball Club
 1982–1996: Samsung Electronics Basketball Club
 1996–2001: Suwon Samsung Thunders
 2001–present: Seoul Samsung Thunders

Current roster

Enlisted players

Season by season

Honours

Domestic

Korean Basketball League
KBL Championship
 Winners: 2000–01, 2005–06
 Runners-up: 2007–08, 2008–09, 2016–17

KBL Regular Season
 Winners: 2000–01
 Runners-up: 2005–06
 Third place: 1999–2000, 2007–08, 2016–17

Continental
FIBA Asia Champions Cup
 Third place: 1988

ABA Club Championship
Winners: 2001, 2007, 2010
 Third place: 2008, 2009

International invitationals
Merlion Cup
 Third place: 2016

References

External links

 Official website 

 
Basketball teams established in 1978
Basketball teams in South Korea
Korean Basketball League teams
Sport in Seoul
Samsung Sports
Cheil Worldwide
1978 establishments in South Korea